Emil Mureşan (born 12 September 1939) is a Romanian water polo player. He competed in the men's tournament at the 1964 Summer Olympics.

See also
 Romania men's Olympic water polo team records and statistics
 List of men's Olympic water polo tournament goalkeepers

References

External links
 

1939 births
Living people
People from Mediaș
Romanian male water polo players
Water polo goalkeepers
Olympic water polo players of Romania
Water polo players at the 1964 Summer Olympics